Nicholas A. Clemente  J.D., LL.M. (2 February 1929 – 4 May 2009)
was a justice of the New York State Supreme Court where he served for over 25 years, mainly in Brooklyn. He was also a  professor, Judicial Hearing Officer and novelist. In 2005, he retired from the bench, after a brief tenure in Sullivan County, New York. He presided over a wide range of civil and criminal matters and became known for his expertise in medical malpractice cases.

Education and other activities
Clemente earned his undergraduate degree in English and History from New York University, his J.D. from  St. John's University and his Ll.M. from New York University School of Law, which he attended on the GI Bill after having served as a legal officer during the Korean War, in the 101st Airborne Division.

He taught business law at CUNY's Borough of Manhattan Community College and served in the New York National Guard as a colonel.

Many of his legal opinions have been published in both the New York Official Reports Service and the New York Law Journal. His experiences as an attorney and judge serve as inspiration for his novels.

Novels 
Pawns of Justice
Broken Gavel

Both books have been reviewed by a number of publications, including the Sullivan County Democrat, Staten Island Advance, New York Law Journal, and the Brooklyn Daily Eagle.

References

External links
 Honorable Justice Nicholas A. Clemente
 NY times Article:  Jury Rules Against Hospital For Negligent Care of Baby NY Times, March 23, 1996
 MILLS BRIEFS FRONTIER EMPLOYEES ON COMPANY’S STATUS New York State Insurance Department, August 29, 2005
 Construction of Pittsford School focus of petitioner's N.Y.

1929 births
2009 deaths
20th-century American novelists
New York Supreme Court Justices
St. John's University (New York City) alumni
Crime novelists
Writers from New York City
New York University School of Law alumni
20th-century American judges
Novelists from New York (state)